Atilio Cremaschi Oyarzún (8 March 1923 – 3 September 2007) was a Chilean footballer who played for Unión Española, Colo-Colo and Rangers of Chile and in the Chile national football team in the 1950 FIFA World Cup in Brazil.

Titles
 Unión Española 1943 and 1951 (Chilean Championship)
 Colo-Colo 1953 and 1956 (Chilean Championship)

External links
 Profile at Colo Colo.cl Profile at

1923 births
2007 deaths
Chilean footballers
Chile international footballers
Colo-Colo footballers
Unión Española footballers
Rangers de Talca footballers
1950 FIFA World Cup players
Association football forwards
People from Punta Arenas